Xiao Pan is a French publisher and distributor of full-color Chinese manhua, both in French-language and original Chinese form.  They are based in France, with offices in Belgium, Switzerland, and Canada.  Several of their titles have been licensed for translation and release to English-speaking audiences.

History
Xiao Pan debuted their work at the Festival international d'Angoulême in 2006, and since then has published works by over three dozen creators.  At New York Comic-Con on April 19, 2008, Tokyopop announced it will debut its new full-color Tokyopop Graphic Novels line in February 2009 with one of Xiao Pan's works, Orange.

Selected authors and works
 Benjamin: Orange, Remember, One Day, Flash
 Nie Jun: Diu Diu, My Street
 Pocket Chocolate: Butterfly in the Air
 Zhang Xiao Yu: Au Fond du Rêve, L'envol
 Lee Shipeng: Dr Forlen
 Liu Feng, Dream
 Jian Yi, Five Colors
 Chen Weidong and Peng Chao: Un Monde Idéal, Le Voyage en Occident
 Ji Di: My Way
 Ji An: Niumao
 Li Yao: La Quête de l'esprit Céleste

References

Comic book publishing companies of France
Manhua distributors